The 2012 Asian Netball Championships was the 8th edition of the tournament. The tournament was played at the Sugathadasa Indoor Stadium in Colombo, Sri Lanka from 25 August to 31 August with ten Asian national netball teams.

Final draw
The final draw used the world rankings to sort the teams in a serpentine format. Japan and Brunei made their international debut.

Preliminary round
All times are SLST (UTC+5:30)

All results are here.

Group A

Group B

Playoff matches
5th to 8th

Knockout round

References

External links
Official website

2012
2012 in Sri Lankan sport
2012 in netball
International netball competitions hosted by Sri Lanka